Elidion Bujar Mara (born 27 June 1997) is an Albanian professional footballer who plays as a forward for Albanian club KF Erzeni.

Club career

Early career
Mara started his youth career at age of 14 with Durrësi 04 under-19, a local youth club part of the Teuta Durrës. He spend the entire 2011–12 season before moving to Teuta Durrës under-17 in September 2012 where during the 2012–13 season he played 18 matches and scored 3 goals. In the next 2012–13 season he played 24 matches scoring 6 goals, but also managed to play a single match for the under-19 side. In the end of the 2014–15 season he gained entry with the first team of Teuta Durrës. So far in the current 2015–16 season for under-19 side, he has played 15 league matches where has scored 8 goals and 2 Cup matches where he has scored 2 goals.

Teuta Durrës
He made it his first professional debut for Teuta Durrës against KF Tirana on 22 May 2015 in the closing match of the 2015–16 Albanian Superliga, coming on as a substitute in the 62nd minute in place of Klejdi Hyka. The match finished in a 1–0 loss.

During the 2015–16 season Mara played for Teuta Durrës B in the Albanian Second Division.

On 6 August 2016 Mara scored twice in the "Durrës County derby" friendly match against Erzeni Shijak.

Besa Kavajë
On 22 January 2017 Mara was loaned to the Albanian First Division side Besa Kavajë among Dajan Shehi until the end of the 2016–17 season. There he rejoined his previous coach Julian Ahmataj.

International career
He was called up for the first time at international level in the Albania national under-19 football team by coach Arjan Bellaj for two friendly matches against Kosovo U19 on 13 & 15 October 2015.

Career statistics

Club

References

External links
 Profile - FSHF

1997 births
Living people
People from Sukth
Association football forwards
Albanian footballers
Albania youth international footballers
KF Teuta Durrës players
KF Korabi Peshkopi players
KF Erzeni players
KS Shkumbini Peqin players
Kategoria Superiore players
Kategoria e Parë players
Kategoria e Dytë players